The Reorganized Party of Labour of Albania is a communist party in Albania. It was founded on July 4, 2007. The First Secretary is Marko Dajti. The party got one local seat in the 2011 elections. In the parliamentary election of 2013, it had 622 votes, and integrated the Alliance for a European Albania.

References

External links
Official website

Political parties in Albania
Communist parties in Albania
Anti-revisionist organizations
Political parties established in 2007
2007 establishments in Albania